Avenionia is a genus of small freshwater snails with a gill and an operculum,  aquatic gastropod mollusk in the family Hydrobiidae.

Species
Species within the genus Avenionia include:
Avenionia berengueri
Avenionia bourguignati
Avenionia brevis (Draparnaud, 1805)
Avenionia ligustica
Avenionia parvula
Avenionia roberti Boeters, 1967

References

 
Hydrobiidae
Taxonomy articles created by Polbot